UDP-glucuronosyltransferase 1-1 also known as UGT-1A is an enzyme that in humans is encoded by the UGT1A1 gene.

UGT-1A is a uridine diphosphate glucuronosyltransferase (UDP-glucuronosyltransferase, UDPGT), an enzyme of the glucuronidation pathway that transforms small lipophilic (fat-soluble) molecules, such as steroids, bilirubin, hormones, and drugs, into water-soluble, excretable metabolites.

Gene 

The UGT1A1 gene is part of a complex locus that encodes several UDP-glucuronosyltransferases. The locus includes thirteen unique alternative first exons followed by four common exons. Four of the alternate first exons are considered pseudogenes. Each of the remaining nine 5' exons may be spliced to the four common exons, resulting in nine proteins with different N-termini and identical C-termini. Each first exon encodes the substrate binding site, and is regulated by its own promoter. Over 100 genetic variants within the UGT1A1 gene have been described, some of which confer increased, reduced or inactive enzymatic activity. The UGT nomenclature committee has compiled a list of these variants, naming each with a * symbol followed by a number.

Clinical significance 

Mutations in this gene cause serious problems for bilirubin metabolism; each syndrome can be caused by one or many mutations, so they are differentiated mostly by symptoms and not particular mutations:
 Gilbert syndrome (GS) can be caused by a variety of genetic changes, but in populations of European and African descent, it is most commonly associated with the UGT1A1*28 allele (rs8175347), a homozygous 2-bp insertion (TA) mutation of the TATA box promoter region of the UGT1A1 gene. This polymorphism impairs proper transcription of UGT1A1 gene, resulting in decreased transcriptional activity of UGT1A1 by about 70%; the resulting reduced enzyme activity leads to the hyperbilirubinemia characteristic of GS. The *28 polymorphism occurs with a frequency of 26-31% in White and 42-56% of African-Americans. About 10-15% of these populations are homozygous for the *28 allele, but only 5% actually develop UGT1A1-associated hyperbilirubinemia, so it appears that this mutation alone may be a necessary but not sufficient factor in GS, perhaps acting in combination with other UGT1A1 mutation(s) to increase the chances of developing GS. In Asian and Pacific Islander populations, UGT1A1*28 is much less common, occurring at a frequency of approximately 9-16% in Asian populations and 4% of Pacific Islanders. In these populations, Gilbert's syndrome is more often due to missense mutations in the coding region of the gene, such as UGT1A1*6 (glycine to arginine substitution at position 71 (G71R); rs4148323)  A special phenobarbital-responsive enhancer module NR3 region (gtPBREM NR3) helps to increase UDPGT enzyme production, which would make it conceptually possible to medically control the bilirubin level, although this is rarely necessary, particularly in adults (usually the level of total serum bilirubin in Gilbert syndrome patients vary from 1 to 6 mg/dL).
Crigler–Najjar syndrome, type I is associated with mutation(s) that result in a complete absence of normal UGT1A1 enzyme, which causes a severe hyperbilirubinemia with levels of total serum bilirubin from 20 to 45 mg/dL. Phenobarbital treatment does not help to lower bilirubin level, because it only increases the amount of mutated UGT1A1 enzyme, which is still unable to catalyze the glucuronidation of bilirubin, which on the other hand makes phenobarbital treatment diagnostically relevant.
Crigler–Najjar syndrome, type II is associated with other mutation(s) that lead to a reduced activity of the mutated UGT1A1 enzyme, which causes a hyperbilirubinemia with levels of total serum bilirubin from 6 to 20 mg/dL. In this case phenobarbital treatment helps to lower bilirubin lever by more than 30%.
Hyperbilirubinemia, familial transient neonatal (also called breastfeeding jaundice) is associated with mutation(s) that alone do not lead to bilirubin level increase in female patients, but their children when breastfed develop from mild to severe hyperbilirubinemia by receiving steroidal substances (with milk) inhibiting glucuronidation of unconjugated bilirubin that may lead to jaundice and even kernicterus.

Pharmacogenetics 

Genetic variations within the UGT1A1 gene have also been associated with the development of certain drug toxicities. The UGT1A1*28 variant, the same allele behind many cases of Gilbert syndrome. The UGT1A1*28 has been associated with an increased risk for neutropenia and Diarrhea in patients receiving the chemotherapeutic drug irinotecan due to the insufficient excrete the active metabolite SN‐38, which primarily undergoes glucuronidation in livers. The U.S. Food and Drug Administration recommends on the irinotecan drug label that patients with the *28/*28 genotype receive a lower starting dose of the drug. The *28 allele has also shown associations with an increased risk for developing diarrhea in patients receiving irinotecan. The UGT1A1*6 variant, more common in Asian populations than the *28 variant, has also shown associations with the development of irinotecan toxicities. Patients who are heterozygous or homozygous for the *6 allele may have a higher risk for developing neutropenia and diarrhea as compared to those with the UGT1A1*1/*1 genotype.

Interactive pathway map

See also 
Glucuronosyltransferase
Lucey-Driscoll syndrome
Neonatal jaundice
Cancer pharmacogenomics

References

Further reading

External links 

UGT nomenclature homepage
PharmGKB page for UGT1A1

Transferases
EC 2.4.1